Khaled Hanani is a paralympic athlete from Algeria competing mainly in category T37 middle-distance events.

Khaled first competed in the Paralympics in 2004 where as well as competing in the T37 800 m he won the bronze medal in the T37 1500 m.  He was unable to repeat this achievement in Beijing in 2008 finishing 8th in the 800 m.

References

Paralympic athletes of Algeria
Athletes (track and field) at the 2004 Summer Paralympics
Athletes (track and field) at the 2008 Summer Paralympics
Paralympic bronze medalists for Algeria
Living people
Medalists at the 2004 Summer Paralympics
Year of birth missing (living people)
Paralympic medalists in athletics (track and field)
21st-century Algerian people
Algerian male middle-distance runners
20th-century Algerian people